is a professional Japanese baseball player.

Koike played outfield and infield for the Chunichi Dragons (2008–2011) and for the Yokohama DeNA BayStars (2012–2013).  Koike announced his retirement on October 1, 2013 and his final at-bat, hit a home run.

In 2014, the Yokohama DeNA BayStars hired Koike as first team batting coach.

External links

 NPB.com

1980 births
Living people
Baseball people from Yokohama
Japanese baseball players
Nippon Professional Baseball outfielders
Yokohama BayStars players
Chunichi Dragons players
Yokohama DeNA BayStars players
Japanese baseball coaches
Nippon Professional Baseball coaches